The Ancient Macedonian calendar is a lunisolar calendar that was in use in ancient Macedon in the  It consisted of 12 synodic lunar months (i.e. 354 days per year), which needed intercalary months to stay in step with the seasons. By the time the calendar was being used across the Hellenistic world, seven total embolimoi (intercalary months) were being added in each 19 year Metonic cycle. The names of the ancient Macedonian Calendar remained in use in Syria even into the Christian era.

Names
The names of the Macedonian months, just like most of the names of Greek months, are derived from feasts and related celebrations in honor of the Greek gods. Most of them combine a Macedonian dialectal form with a clear Greek etymology (e.g Δῐός from Zeus; Περίτιος from Heracles Peritas (“Guardian”) ; Ξανδικός/Ξανθικός from Xanthos, “the blond” (probably a reference to Heracles); Άρτεμίσιος from Artemis etc.) with the possible exception of one, which is attested in other Greek calendars as well.

Description
The Macedonian calendar was in essence the Babylonian calendar with the substitution of Macedonian names for the Babylonian ones, and as such it paralleled the Hebrew calendar which is also lunisolar, and was used during the Parthian Empire too. An example of  inscriptions from Decapolis, Jordan, bearing the Solar Macedonian calendar, starts from the month Audynaeus. The solar type was merged later with the Julian calendar. In Roman Macedonia, both calendars were used. The Roman one is attested in inscriptions with the name Kalandôn gen.  calendae and the Macedonian Hellenikei dat.  Hellenic. Finally an inscription from Kassandreia of about   bearing a month  Athenaion suggests that some cities may have used their own months even after the  Macedonian expansion.

 ‡   Months marked with a double-dagger and including the word "Embolimos" were used only occasionally, for intercalation, as noted in the remarks

Year numbering

Years were usually counted from the re-conquest of Seleucus I Nicator of Babylon, which became "year 1".  This is equivalent to 312 BCE / 311 BCE in the Anno Domini year count of the modern Gregorian calendar.  This practice spread outside the Seleucid Empire and found use in Antigonid Macedonia, Ptolemaic Egypt, and other major Hellenistic states descended from Alexander's conquests as well.  Years can be abbreviated SE, S.E., or occasionally AG (Anno Graecorum).

See also
 Ancient Greek calendars
 Attic calendar

References

Calendar
Obsolete calendars
Calendar
Lunisolar calendars